Universitario de Deportes' 2011 season is the club's 83rd season in the Primera División of Peru and 46th in the Torneo Descentralizado. They will participate in their 5th season in the Copa Sudamericana.

Club information

Board of directors

Coaching staff

Squad information
As of 4 June 2011

Transfers

In

Out

Competitions

Pre-season

Torneo Descentralizado

League table

Matches
Kick off times are in UTC-5.

Notes

Torneo Intermedio

U-20 Copa Libertadores

Kick off times are in UTC-5.

Group A

Quarterfinals

Semifinals

Final

Copa Sudamericana

Second stage

Round of 16

Quarterfinals

Other friendlies
Kick off times are in UTC-5.

Squad statistics

Goalscorers

Miscellaneous
The U-20 Copa Libertadores became the club's first international title.

References

External links
Club website oficial

2011
Universitario De Deportes